Carmelo Tomaselli (born 9 May 1938) is an Argentine boxer. He competed in the men's bantamweight event at the 1956 Summer Olympics.

References

1938 births
Living people
Argentine male boxers
Olympic boxers of Argentina
Boxers at the 1956 Summer Olympics
Place of birth missing (living people)
Bantamweight boxers